Grafton Airport could refer to:
Clarence Valley Regional Airport, formerly named Grafton Airport
Grafton Airport (Massachusetts), a closed airport in Massachusetts